Travel blending is a technique, developed in Australia, for encouraging people to make more efficient and environmentally sound transportation choices. The technique involves governments encouraging citizens to deal with a greater number of tasks on one given trip rather than making several trips to multiple locations at different times, thus hopefully improving travel efficiency and decreasing the strain on transportation networks.

The technique originated in Sydney as an effort to reduce Sydney's air pollution before the 2000 Summer Olympics.

External links 
 , an ITDP paper.

Transportation planning